The NEC PC-6600 Series were a lineup of personal computers produced by the NEC Corporation in 1985. They were essentially a PC-6001 MK2 with a built-in 3.5" floppy disk drive. Two models in this series were produced: the PC-6601 and the PC-6601 SR.

References 
OLD-COMPUTERS.COM: The Museum: NEC PC 6601

PC-6601
Computer-related introductions in 1985
Z80-based home computers